Rodeo (also known as Rodeo - Colola) is a locality and the head town of the Iglesia Department, located in the northwest of the San Juan Province, Argentina. It is a town that has experienced significant tourist growth, with the presence of an important accommodation infrastructure, being one of the main attractions of the San Juan Province.

Its main communication route is the RN 150, a route that would make it a component locality of the future bioceanic corridor, after the construction of a tunnel in the Agua Negra Pass, connecting it with the extreme northeast of the province, the center of the country. and the ports of Coquimbo in Chile and Porto Alegre in Brazil.

References 

Populated places in San Juan Province, Argentina